House at the End of the Street is a 2012 American psychological thriller film directed by Mark Tonderai that stars Jennifer Lawrence. The film's plot revolves around a teenage girl, Elissa, who along with her newly divorced mother Sarah, moves to a new neighborhood only to discover that the house at the end of the street was the site of a gruesome double homicide committed by a thirteen-year-old girl named Carrie Anne who had disappeared without a trace four years prior. Elissa then starts a relationship with Carrie Anne's older brother Ryan, who lives in the same house, but nothing is as it appears to be.

Although filming had been completed in 2010, the film was not released until 2012 by Relativity Media. Despite a negative response from critics, the film was a moderate commercial success.

Plot
Newly divorced medical doctor Sarah Cassidy (Elisabeth Shue) and her 17-year-old daughter Elissa (Jennifer Lawrence) move to a small, upscale suburb. They are disturbed to discover the house they are moving into is on the same street as a house in which a family used to live until the parents were murdered. The story of the massacre is told to them by the neighbors. Four years prior, a girl named Carrie-Anne Jacobson killed her parents, then fled into the forest and was never seen again, leaving her brother Ryan (Max Thieriot) as the sole survivor. Ryan now lives alone and is hated by his neighbors; Bill Weaver (Gil Bellows), a local police officer, appears to be Ryan's only supporter.

Their mother-daughter relationship becomes rocky and Elissa starts seeing Ryan against her mother's wishes, finding Ryan to be lonely but a sweet boy. Ryan confides in her that he accidentally injured Carrie-Anne by allowing her to fall from a swing when they were little; he was supposed to be watching her while their parents were getting high on drugs. The resulting brain damage from the accident made her extremely aggressive, leading to their parents' murder.  Ryan is revealed to have been secretly taking care of a seemingly now-grown Carrie-Anne (Eva Link) in a hidden room. Carrie-Anne manages to escape and approaches a young couple in a car while brandishing a kitchen knife. Ryan catches up to her before she can reach the couple but accidentally kills her while trying to hide her. In grief, he goes to a diner, where he meets a kind waitress named Peggy Johns (Jordan Hayes).

Later, some unruly high school boys pick a fight with Ryan and he flees, and Elissa drives to his house and extinguishes a fire the boys started. She finds tampons in the kitchen garbage and explores the house with suspicion until she finds the secret room and is attacked by Carrie-Anne, who is revealed to actually be Peggy. Ryan restrains "Carrie-Anne" while frantically screaming at Elissa to leave. Elissa finds blue contact lenses and Peggy Johns's wallet in the kitchen. Ryan has kidnapped the waitress and attempted to make her look like Carrie-Anne. Elissa tells Ryan she has to go home but Ryan hits her, knocking her unconscious.

Elissa wakes to find herself tightly tied to a chair. Ryan reveals to her that Carrie Anne didn't kill their parents. In fact, she died during the accident on the swing set. It was Ryan who killed their parents, after suffering years of abuse because they blamed him for his younger sister's death. This leads to the final revelation: The "Carrie Annes" he has been keeping in the basement were kidnapped women who he made up to look just like his younger sister. 
He explains that he wants Elissa, but that he needs Carrie-Anne and knows that he cannot have both. Officer Weaver goes to Ryan's house to look for Elissa, but Ryan stabs him to death. Elissa frees herself and tries to escape in Ryan's car, but Ryan knocks her out with chloroform and traps her in his car trunk with Peggy's body. Sarah arrives and is also stabbed by Ryan. Elissa struggles out of the car and ultimately shoots Ryan with Weaver's gun. When she approaches him, he suddenly wakes up and grabs her wrist. When Ryan attempts to stab Elissa with the knife, Sarah strikes him in the head with the hammer.

Elissa and Sarah move out and Ryan is placed in a psychiatric ward. A flashback had depicted Young Ryan in girl's clothing about to blow out birthday candles. His mother calls him "Carrie-Anne" and when Ryan protested that his name is Ryan, she just slapped him violently. While doing a puzzle, Ryan begins to hear the voices of his deceased parents saying that he is Carrie-Anne.

Cast

Production
The film was originally announced in 2003 with Jonathan Mostow directing and Richard Kelly writing. The film went through development hell for seven years until production was revived in 2010 with Mark Tonderai directing and David Loucka writing, instead.

Principal photography and filming mostly took place in Metcalfe, Ontario and Carp, Ontario from August 2, 2010, until September 3, 2010.

Release
The film was originally scheduled to be released in February 2012, but was moved to a September 2012 release. The film had its theatrical premiere in the United States on September 21, 2012, and was released in Canada on the same date. The film was not released theatrically in Sweden or Spain and was released direct-to-video on January 30, 2013, in Sweden and on August 28, 2013 in Spain.

Novelization
A tie-in novelization of the movie was released on August 12, 2012, to accompany the movie by Little, Brown and Company.

Home Media
House at the End of the Street was released on DVD and Blu-ray Disc on January 8, 2013.

The unrated cut was also released on January 8, 2013. The extended edition increased the length of certain scenes in the final cut by a few seconds and the amount of violence, blood, and gore was increased by a small amount.

The extended cut also included an additional twist, in which Bill Weaver was actually a close family friend of the Jacobsons and was aware of Carrie-Anne's fate, and he also knew about Ryan's abuse but did nothing to help him. On the day of Carrie-Anne's accident, he supplied John and Mary Jacobson with drugs and actually could have prevented Carrie-Anne's death if he had not sold them the drugs, as they had prevented John and Mary from heeding the cries of their only son, and he was then disowned as a close friend by John Jacobson.

Reception

Box office
The film debuted at number one at the US box office on its opening Friday and Saturday nights. In what was one of the tightest races in years for first place at the box-office weekend, the film finished the weekend at number two with $12.3 million, just less than a million behind End of Watch, which included takings from Thursday night through Monday morning, where that movie finished at number one, with $13.1 million. The film went on to gross over $44 million worldwide, from a budget of $6.9-10 million.

Critical reception
On Rotten Tomatoes, the film has an approval rating of 13% based on 66 reviews with an average rating of 3.72/10. The website's critical consensus reads, "Poorly conceived, clumsily executed, and almost completely bereft of scares, House at the End of the Street strands its talented star in a film as bland as its title." On Metacritic, the film has a score of 31 out of 100 based on 19 critics, indicating "generally unfavorable reviews". Audiences polled by CinemaScore gave the film an average grade of "B" on an A+ to F scale.

Awards

References

External links
 
 

2012 films
2012 horror films
2012 horror thriller films
2010s psychological horror films
2012 psychological thriller films
2010s teen horror films
American films about revenge
American horror thriller films
American psychological horror films
American psychological thriller films
American teen horror films
Cross-dressing in American films
FilmNation Entertainment films
Films about dysfunctional families
Films about murderers
Films directed by Mark Tonderai
Films shot in Ottawa
2010s English-language films
2010s American films